The 1952 Louisiana gubernatorial election was held in two rounds on January 15 and February 19, 1952. Like most Southern states between the Reconstruction Era and the Civil Rights Movement, Louisiana's Republican Party was virtually nonexistent in terms of electoral support.

This meant that the two Democratic Party primary elections held on these dates were the real contest over who would be governor of Louisiana. The 1952 election saw the defeat of Long candidate Carlos Spaht, and the election of Robert F. Kennon as governor.

In the low-turnout general election held on April 22, 1952, Kennon defeated Harrison Bagwell, a Baton Rouge lawyer and only the second Louisiana Republican gubernatorial nominee since Reconstruction. Kennon received 118,723 votes (96 percent) to Bagwell's 4,958 votes (4 percent).

Results 

First Democratic Party Primary, January 15

Second Democratic Party Primary, February 19

References

Sources 

Louisiana Secretary of State.   Democratic Primary Election Returns, 1952.

1952
Louisiana
Gubernatorial
January 1952 events in the United States
February 1952 events in the United States